The Devil Is a Woman, based on the Pierre Louys novel La Femme et le pantin, may refer to:
La Femme et le pantin (1928 film), directed by Jacques de Baroncelli and starring Conchita Montenegro
The Devil Is a Woman (1935 film), directed by Josef von Sternberg and starring Marlene Dietrich
The Devil Is a Woman (1950 film), directed by Tito Davison
 La femme et le Pantin (1959 film) directed by Julien Duvivier, starring Brigitte Bardot
The Devil Is a Woman (1974 film), directed by Damiano Damiani
That Obscure Object of Desire, a 1977 film directed by Luis Buñuel, starring Fernando Rey, Ángela Molina, and Carole Bouquet

See also
 Devil Woman (disambiguation)
 A Devil of a Woman, a 1951 Austrian drama film